In functional programming, a result type is a Monadic type holding a returned value or an error code. They provide an elegant way of handling errors, without resorting to exception handling; when a function that may fail returns a result type, the programmer is forced to consider success or failure paths, before getting access to the expected result; this eliminates the possibility of an erroneous programmer assumption.

Examples 

 In Scala, the standard library also defines an  type, however Scala also has more conventional exception handling.

Rust 
The result object has the methods is_ok() and is_err().
const CAT_FOUND: bool = true;

fn main() {
    let result = pet_cat();
    if result.is_ok() {
        println!("Great, we could pet the cat!");
    } else {
        println!("Oh no, we couldn't pet the cat!");
    }
}

fn pet_cat() -> Result<(), String> {
    if CAT_FOUND {
        Ok(())
    } else {
        Err(String::from("the cat is nowhere to be found"))
    }
}

See also 
 Option type
 Exception handling
 Tagged union
 Return type

References

Functional programming